Timothy van der Meulen (born 2 March 1990 in Amsterdam) is a Dutch footballer who plays as a centre back for FC Lisse. Van der Meulen previously played on loan from Ajax for HFC Haarlem in the Eerste Divisie and joined Dundee United on a short-term deal in January 2011. He represented the Netherlands U-17 team at the 2007 UEFA European Under-17 Football Championship.

Club career
In early 2010, Van der Meulen was sent out on loan to Eerste Divisie side HFC Haarlem to gain more experience. He made his debut on 22 January 2010 in a 0–3 away loss to SBV Excelsior. It would turn out to be his only match for Haarlem because the club soon afterward went into bankruptcy, meaning he had to return to Ajax for the remainder of the 2009–10 season. He joined Scottish Premier League club Dundee United on a short-term deal after a successful trial. He joined Bayern Munich II in July 2011 and ended his first season as joint top scorer (with Saër Sène), scoring 8 goals.

In 2012, he moved on a free transfer to De Graafschap. On 1 February 2014 his contract got dissolved.

International career
Van der Meulen represented the Netherlands U-17 team at the 2007 UEFA European Under-17 Football Championship. Van der Meulen was in the starting line-up for all three group games against Belgium, Iceland, and England, but the team failed to qualify for the second round.

Statistics

References

External links
 
 

1990 births
Living people
Dutch footballers
HFC Haarlem players
Eerste Divisie players
Dundee United F.C. players
FC Bayern Munich II players
Footballers from Amsterdam
AFC Ajax players
Almere City FC players
De Graafschap players
Association football defenders
Expatriate footballers in Scotland
Dutch expatriate footballers
Expatriate footballers in Germany
Scottish Premier League players
Regionalliga players